Jean Roy (1916 – 22 September 2011) was a French music critic and musicologist, born in Paris.

Career 
In 1946, with Armand Panigel, Jean Roy was among the co-founders of the radio program  for the RTF then France Musique, a journalist for La Revue musicale of Henry Prunières, for Diapason then le Monde de la musique, secretary of the annual magazine Cahiers Maurice Ravel, whose number 14 of 2011 was dedicated to him. He was vice-president of the "Amis de Francis Poulenc", president of the "Amis de Darius Milhaud", and president of the "Roger Désormière committee".

Publications 
1954: La Vie de Berlioz racontée par Berlioz, Paris, Éditions Julliard, .
1962: Présences contemporaines : musique française, Nouvelles Éditions Debresse, .
1964: Francis Poulenc, Paris, Seghers, .
1968: Darius Milhaud, Seghers, .
1983: Bizet, Paris, Éditions du Seuil,  "Solfèges" n°40, 192 p. .
1986: Maurice Ravel : Lettres à Roland-Manuel et à sa famille, Quimper, Calligrammes, (edition, preface and notes by Jean Roy)
1989: Ravel d'après Ravel suivi de Rencontres avec Vlado Perlemuter, éditions Alinéa
1994: Le Groupe des Six, Le Seuil, 1994, .
1997: Samson François, le poète du piano, éditions Josette Lyon, .
  (book with a CD)

References

External links 
 Le Groupe des Six - Une évocation par diverses personnalités, with Jean Roy

1916 births
Writers from Paris
French music critics
20th-century French musicologists
French biographers
2011 deaths